RP, the International Conference on Reachability Problems is an annual academic conference in the
field of computer science.

The RP is specifically aimed at gathering together scholars from diverse disciplines and backgrounds interested in reachability problems that appear in
 Algebraic structures
 Automata Theory and Formal languages
 Concurrency and Distributed computations
 Decision Procedures in Computational models
 Hybrid systems
 Logic and Model checking
 Formal verification of Finite and Infinite-state Systems
  Algorithmic game theory

Topics of interest include (but are not limited to): Reachability problems in infinite state systems, rewriting systems, dynamical and hybrid systems; reachability problems in logic and verification; reachability analysis in different computational models, counter timed/ cellular/ communicating automata; Petri nets; computational aspects of algebraic structures (semigroups, groups and rings); frontiers between decidable and undecidable reachability problems; predictability in iterative maps and new computational paradigms.

History of the Workshop 
  RP'22  in Kaiserslautern, Germany, LNCS proceedings, Springer Verlag
  RP'21  in Liverpool, UK, LNCS proceedings, volume 13035, Springer Verlag
  RP'20  in Paris, France, LNCS proceedings, volume 12448, Springer Verlag
  RP'19  in Brussels, Belgium, LNCS proceedings, volume 11674, Springer Verlag
 RP'18  in Marseille, France, LNCS proceedings, volume 11123, Springer Verlag
 RP'17  in London, UK, LNCS proceedings, Springer Verlag
 RP'16 in Aalborg, Denmark, LNCS proceedings, Springer Verlag
 RP'15 in Warsaw, Poland, LNCS proceedings, Springer Verlag
 RP'14 in Oxford, UK, LNCS proceedings, Springer Verlag
 RP'13 in Uppsala, Sweden, LNCS proceedings, Springer Verlag
 RP'12 in Bordeaux, France, LNCS proceedings, Volume 7550/2012, Springer Verlag
 RP'11 in Genova, Italy, LNCS proceedings, Volume 6945/2011, Springer Verlag 
 RP'10 in Brno, Czech Republic, LNCS proceedings, Volume 6227/2010, Springer Verlag
 RP'09 in Palaiseau, France, LNCS proceedings, Volume 5797/2009, Springer Verlag
 RP'08 in Liverpool, UK, ENTCS proceedings, Volume 223, Elsevier 
 RP'07 in Turku, Finland, TUCS General Publication Serie, Volume 45, Turku Centre for Computer Science

References 

Theory of computation